Guthrie Historic District can refer to:
(sorted by state)

 Guthrie Historic District (Guthrie, Kentucky), listed on the National Register of Historic Places (NRHP) in Todd County
 Guthrie Historic District (Guthrie, Oklahoma), listed on the NRHP in Logan County